Georgeville is an unincorporated community in Crow River Township, Stearns County, Minnesota, United States.  The community is located along State Highway 55 (MN 55) near its junction with 393rd Avenue.

References

Unincorporated communities in Stearns County, Minnesota
Unincorporated communities in Minnesota